South Beach is a nightclub with after hours located in Houston, Texas within the Neartown area which opened in 2001 on the former site of Club Heaven. The  dance club located at 810 Pacific Street was popular among the city's gay community. Among South Beach’s many features was a full-color water-cooled matrix laser light show utilizing Kryogen Ifex liquid ice jets that spray out a thick cloud of liquid Ice.

South Beach is owned by Charles Armstrong. Charles Armstrong also owns JR's Bar & Grill, and formerly owned Meteor Urban Lounge, and Montrose Mining Company before they closed.

Reception
In 2007, the club was voted Houston's Best Gay Bar by AOL City Guide and again was awarded Houston's Best Gay Bar 2008 and Houston's Best Dance Club 2008 by AOL City Guide. The club was previously awarded as one of the "Best of 2006" by the Houston Press.

References

External links

 
South Beach Nightclub Homepage

2002 establishments in Texas
Defunct LGBT nightclubs in Texas
LGBT culture in Houston
LGBT nightclubs in Texas
Neartown, Houston